Ascension Sacred Heart Hospital Emerald Coast is a 76-bed hospital located in Miramar Beach, Florida. 

It is part of the Ascension hospital system.

References 

Hospitals in Florida
Walton County, Florida